Roopkar was the first Assamese language, tabloid-sized magazine about Assamese cinema, theater and culture. Established in 1974, the magazine was founded and edited by journalist and writer Pabitra Kumar Deka. Advisers of the magazine were singer & composer Bhupen Hazarika and writer Nirode Choudhury.

Roopkar was published on a monthly basis. It was the most popular entertainment magazine in the Northeast; it also instituted the first popular film awards Roopkar Awards in Assam in 1975. Many new and young journalists contributed to the magazine, some of whom have made a mark in the field of cinema journalism like Kamal Lochan Das, Shekharjyoti Bhuyan, Arun Lochan Das, Rejek Aji Ahmed, Azim Hazarika, Hemanta Kumar Das, Jibaraj Barman, Utpal Datta, Bidyut Kumar Bhuyan, Sanjib Hazarika, etc. The Kolkata correspondent for the magazine was Nitai Ghosh. The magazine existed till the early nineties. 

Besides cultural reporting, various renowned writers like Padma Borkotoki, Lakshmi Nandan Bora, Nirode Choudhury, Ratna Oza, Arun Goswami, Udayaditya Bharali, Nitya Bora, Debabrat Das, Dilip Chandan, Satya Ranjan Kalita, Prafulla Kumar Dutta etc. wrote social novels for the magazine. Bhupen Hazarika also wrote his famous column Anyamat in the seventies.   

A film critic and a former reporter of the magazine, Utpal Datta, made a short film on Pabitra Kumar Deka titled Bye Lane 2 which got selected in various film festivals including the Indian Panorama Section in the Goa International Film festival in 2014.

Roopkar Award was instituted in 2011 in the memory of its founder Pabitra Kumar Deka. It is given yearly to one distinguished personality in the field of stage, cinema and media.

Roopkar Award winners
 2011 – Ratna Oza – Writer & Stage director
 2012 – Tapan Das – Actor, Director & Short story writer
 2013 – Munin Barua – Film Director & Playwright 
 2014 – Arun Lochan Das – Film Journalist
 2015 – Sashi Phukan – Publisher & Editor of Bismoi Magazine
 2016 – Nayan Prasad – Actor & Stage director
 2017 – Samarendra Narayan Dev – Film & Stage director
 2018 – Tapan Das – Still Photographer & Founder of PVTI
 2019 – Jahnu Barua – Film Director
 2020 – Arun Nath – Film & Stage Actor
 2021 – Pranjal Saikia – Film & Stage Actor
 2022 – Mridul Gupta – Film Director

References

1974 establishments in India
Assamese-language mass media
Defunct magazines published in India
Film magazines published in India
Monthly magazines published in India
Magazines established in 1974
Mass media in Assam
Theatre magazines
Magazines with year of disestablishment missing
1990s disestablishments in India